Heuchera caroliniana, the Carolina alumroot, is a species of flowering plant in the family Saxifragaceae, native to the US states of Virginia, North Carolina and South Carolina. Split off from Heuchera americana, which it closely resembles, it is found the northwestern and west-central Piedmont, where H.americana is largely absent. It grows in rich upland woods on base-saturated substrates, basic dikes, and basic rock outcroppings.

References

caroliniana
Endemic flora of the United States
Flora of North Carolina
Flora of South Carolina
Flora of Virginia
Plants described in 1979
Flora without expected TNC conservation status